Carpool is a 1996 American comedy film directed by Arthur Hiller, written by Don Rhymer, starring Tom Arnold and David Paymer. The film was theatrically released with Superior Duck as the preceding cartoon.

As of March 20, 2019, the film rights to Carpool are owned by the Walt Disney Studios through 20th Century Fox, which had obtained the film rights from Warner Bros. in the mid-2010s.

Plot
Workaholic Daniel Miller is forced to drive their family carpool when Diane Miller becomes ill. Daniel is in the middle of a huge advertising campaign for Hammerman's, a large chain of delis, and initially refuses the carpool until Mrs. Miller guilts him. It includes two sons, Andrew and Bucky, two local ladies; Chelsea and her older sister, Kayla, and local weirdo Travis. Meanwhile, Franklin Laszlo is the owner of a failing carnival. Franklin has the bright idea to rob a bank in order to get the money to keep his business going. As Franklin leaves to attempt his bank robbery, he enters a local Hammerman's where Daniel is also at. Two gunmen: Neil and Jerry, who also co-incidentally plan to rob the deli, hold it up and eventually a standoff ensues between them, an older woman, Franklin, and a local detective, Lt. Erdman. Through a series of misunderstandings, Franklin takes Daniel as the hostage and has Hammerman's money that the gunmen had stolen from the deli. Heading to the van, Franklin kidnaps Daniel and the children. The group bonds through a series of misadventures; stopping at a hair salon to use the restroom, evading the police using a disguise, and eventually being chased by an obsessed meter maid, Martha. Franklin reveals to the group the reason behind his robbery and kidnapping: keeping the carnival open so he can see his son.

Eventually, Franklin takes the group to his carnival, where the children enjoy the rides. The gunmen, Neil & Jerry have tracked Franklin through his wallet, which he had dropped in the deli, and want Hammerman's money. A fight ensues, with the controls to the Ferris wheel being damaged. Daniel uses his advertising materials to jam the mechanism of the ride and climbs up to rescue Andrew. Franklin ties up the gunmen Neil and Jerry, locks them into the Zipper and gets his wallet back. Daniel realizes it's too late to attend his pitch meeting, but Franklin convinces him otherwise. Daniel arrives late and unprepared but successfully pitches to Mr. Hammerman that children don't like his chain and that a revamp to something more kid-friendly would help. Franklin likes the idea and Daniel gains the backbone to tell him he quit. Eventually the police arrive but Daniel does not wish to press charges and Franklin is let off the hook.

Sometime later, Franklin and Daniel are co-owners of the carnival, with Mr. Hammerman supplying them with food. Everything seems to be okay, until Franklin realizes he missed a lunch date with his mother, who is shown destroying a local Sizzler over the closing credits.

Cast

 Tom Arnold as Franklin Laszlo
 David Paymer as Daniel Miller
 Rhea Perlman as Martha
 Rod Steiger as Mr. Hammerman
 Kim Coates as Lt. Erdman
 Rachael Leigh Cook as Kayla
 Mikey Kovar as Andrew Miller, Daniel's son
 Micah Gardener as Bucky Miller, Daniel's son
 Jordan Warkol as Travis
 Colleen Rennison as Chelsea, Kayla's younger sister
 Ian Tracey as Neil
 John Tench as Jerry
 Stellina Rusich as Diane Miller, Daniel's wife
 David Kaye as Scott Lewis
 Obba Babatundè as Jeffery
 Edie McClurg, Kathleen Freeman, and Miriam Flynn as Voice of Franklin's Mom

Production
The film was directed by Arthur Hiller. Hiller was also the president of the Academy of Motion Picture Arts and Sciences at that time. The script was written by Don Rhymer.

Reception

Box office
The film opened theatrically on August 23, 1996 in 1,487 venues nationwide and earned $1,628,482 in its first weekend, ranking thirteenth in the domestic box office. At the end of its run, it had grossed $3,325,651. Based on an estimated $17 million budget, it was a box office bomb.

Critical response
The film was not screened in advance for critics and received minimal promotion. On Rotten Tomatoes, it has a score of 13% based on 23 reviews, with an average rating of 2.6/10. On Metacritic the film has a score of 15 out of 100 based on reviews from 10 critics, indicating "overwhelming dislike". Audiences surveyed by CinemaScore gave the film a grade of B− on scale of A to F.

Ty Burr for Entertainment Weekly calls the film "Hard to hate, but just about impossible to like" and gives it grade D+. Variety called it: "Low-tech, high-volume slapstick, "Carpool" is a ramshackle if amiable chase comedy that should have some appeal for end-of-summer family outings." Janet Maslin, of The New York Times, pointed out that the supporting characters, especially Rhea Perlman, end up standing out with more pleasant moments when compared to the performance of Tom Arnold. Rita Kempley of The Washington Post, emphasizes that in contrast to the character of Daniel who discovers that life should be fun, the film is not the same for the viewer.

Accolades
Arnold tied with Pauly Shore for a 1996 Razzie Award in part for his role in the film as well as for Big Bully and The Stupids. He also won Worst Actor for the same movies at the 1996 Stinkers Bad Movie Awards; said movies were also dishonourable mentions for Worst Picture.

References

External links
 
 
 
 

1990s chase films
1996 comedy films
1996 films
American comedy films
Films scored by John Debney
Films directed by Arthur Hiller
Films set in Seattle
Films shot in Vancouver
Golden Raspberry Award winning films
Regency Enterprises films
Warner Bros. films
Films produced by Arnon Milchan
1990s English-language films
1990s American films